"Down with the King" is the first single from Run-DMC's sixth studio album of the same name. It featured artists Pete Rock & CL Smooth, with Pete Rock producing the song.

After three unsuccessful singles from the group's previous album, "Down with the King" became Run-D.M.C.'s second-biggest hit after "Walk This Way", peaking at No. 21 on the Billboard Hot 100 and becoming  their only single to reach the top spot on the Hot Rap Singles chart.

The music video, which was directed by Marcus Raboy, received heavy airplay and featured cameos from Eazy-E, Redman, Kris Kross, Jermaine Dupri, Onyx, Salt-n-Pepa, KRS-One, EPMD, A Tribe Called Quest, De La Soul, MC Lyte, Kid Capri, Das EFX, P.M. Dawn and Naughty by Nature. The song contains samples of James Rado's "Where Do I Go" from the original Broadway cast recording of the rock musical Hair and Run–D.M.C.'s 1988 single "Run's House". Pete Rock and CL Smooth's verses contain reused lyrics from Run DMC's 1983 single "Sucker M.C.'s". "Down with the King" was certified Gold by the RIAA on May 11, 1993.

Track listing

A-side
"Down with the King" – 5:00

B-side
"Down with the King" (instrumental) – 5:18
"Down with the King" (radio version) – 4:15

Charts

Weekly charts

Year-end charts

References 

1992 songs
1993 singles
Run-DMC songs
Music videos directed by Marcus Raboy
Song recordings produced by Pete Rock
Songs written by Pete Rock
Songs written by Joseph Simmons
Songs written by Darryl McDaniels
Posse cuts
Songs written by CL Smooth